The 2007 Vuelta a Murcia was the 23rd edition of the Vuelta a Murcia cycle race and was held on 7 March to 11 March 2007. The race started in San Pedro del Pinatar and finished in Murcia. The race was won by Alejandro Valverde.

General classification

References

2007
2007 in road cycling
2007 in Spanish sport